The trick-taking genre of card games is one of the most common varieties, found in every part of the world. The following is a list of trick-taking games by type of pack:

52-card French-suited pack

32- or 36-card French-suited packs

German-suited packs 
The following games are played with German-suited packs of 32, 33 or 36 cards. Some are played with shortened packs e.g. Schnapsen. German-suited packs are common, not just in Germany, but in Austria and Eastern Europe.

Italian-suited cards

Spanish-suited cards 
The following games are played with 40- or 48-card Spanish-suited packs.

Tarock pack 
Tarot card games are played with a Tarock pack, usually of 54 or 78 cards comprising four French suits and a special trump suit of Tarots or Tarocks. The following games are played with such packs:

Dedicated deck 
The following games use a dedicated deck of cards to play.

External links
Classification of trick taking games at Pagat.com

Trick-taking card games
 List of trick-taking card games